Mercy Ships is an international charity based on Christian values that operates the largest non-governmental hospital ships in the world, providing humanitarian aid like free health care, community development projects, community health education, mental health programs, agriculture projects, and palliative care for terminally ill patients. Its headquarters are in Lausanne in Switzerland.

Mercy Ships has visited more than 55 developing nations and 18 developed nations around the world, with a focus on the countries of Africa for the past 30 years.

A major inspiration for Mercy Ships founder Don Stephens was the work of the international hospital ship . Stephens' research showed that 95 of the 100 largest cities in the world were port cities. Therefore, a hospital ship could deliver healthcare very efficiently to large numbers of people. The birth of Stephens' disabled son, John Paul, also inspired him to move forward with his vision of a floating hospital. A visit with Mother Teresa in Calcutta, India, further deepened his commitment to serving people in need.

History
Mercy Ships was founded in 1978 by Don and Deyon Stephens in Lausanne in Switzerland. The first ocean liner acquired was the Victoria, which was purchased for its scrap value of US $1 million. The nine-deck vessel was transformed into the hospital ship  over a four-year period. The 522-foot ship was equipped with three operating rooms, a dental clinic, an x-ray machine, a laboratory and 40 patient beds. The ship's 350-member crew included Mercy Ships founders Don and Deyon Stephens, who lived on board the ship with their four young children for ten years.

In 1983, the Anastasis (the Greek word for "resurrection") began operations in the South Pacific, then moved to Central America and the Caribbean Sea in the mid-80s. The ship moved on to Africa in 1991 and remained in service there until 2007. The final port of call for the Anastasis was Monrovia, Liberia.

Originally, Mercy Ships was a part of the YWAM (Youth with a Mission) family of Christian ministries, before becoming a standalone organization in 2003. The organization historically uses retired ocean liners and ferries that have been transformed into floating hospitals. In 2021, however, its first purpose-built hospital ship, the Global Mercy, joined the fleet.

Mercy Ships purchased the Norwegian coastal ferry MS Polarlys in 1994 and transformed it into the MV Caribbean Mercy, a hospital ship serving Central American and Caribbean ports. The ship offered berths for 150 crew and was equipped initially for field medical clinics. Over the course of several years, the ship was equipped with modern eye-surgery capabilities. The first eye surgery was performed on board the Caribbean Mercy in early 1997, while the ship was docked in Guatemala. On land, volunteers from the Caribbean Mercy also provided dental, orthopedic and healthcare services. The Caribbean Mercy visited 138 ports of call and remained in service until May 2005.

In 1983, the Canadian ferry formerly MV Petite Forte of CN Marine was donated to Mercy Ships to provide relief operations in the Caribbean. Initially christened the MV Good Samaritan, the ship was re-christened the MV Island Mercy in 1994. The 60-berth vessel remained in service until spring of 2001 before being sold as training ship Far East I. The countries it served included Brazil, the Dominican Republic, Guyana and Haiti. The ship also reached beyond the Caribbean with relief and medical operations in Guinea-Bissau, Western Samoa, the Tokelau Islands and New Zealand.

Since 2000, Mercy Ships has the 16,500-ton vessel Africa Mercy, which measures almost 500 feet long. The Africa Mercy has greater capacity than all three previous Mercy Ships combined. In May 2007, the Africa Mercy sailed into the port in Monrovia to meet up with the Anastasis, enabling crew, equipment, and supplies to be transferred from the oldest Mercy Ship to the new one.

In 2007, the Africa Mercy made her official maiden voyage to Monrovia, Liberia, from the shipyard in England. In 2008, the Africa Mercy continued her service to Liberia, offering free surgeries, assistance in healthcare infrastructure development, and community-based preventive health care programs that benefited thousands of individuals and many communities. More than 1,200 surgical procedures and 10,000 dental procedures were completed, along with community health projects such as HIV/AIDS prevention and construction of wells and latrines.

Early in 2010, the ship was docked in Lomé, Togo, for the 2010 field service. In August 2010, the Africa Mercy went into shipyard in South Africa, where it was equipped with new, more efficient generators. In 2009, the ship was docked in Cotonou, Benin, from February to December, providing free surgeries and medical care. Mercy Ships also worked with Beninese citizens on agriculture and water development projects on the ground in Benin. Before the Africa Mercy arrives in port, flyers are distributed to alert the public to the ship's upcoming visit. An advance team begins a massive screening of thousands of prospective patients, to see who qualified for a surgery. It is common for people to walk for days (and even from neighboring countries) to find out whether they may be eligible for surgical treatment.

After spending 10 months in Conakry, Guinea, from August 2018 until June 2019, the Africa Mercy traveled to the Canary Islands for her annual maintenance period. Prior to that, the volunteer crew completed a field service in Douala, Cameroon, which lasted from August 2017 through June 2018. Prior to that, the Africa Mercy served in the port of Cotonou, Benin, August 2016 to the summer of 2017. The summer of 2016 was spent completing dry dock and annual maintenance in Durban, South Africa. The ship was previously docked in Toamasina, Madagascar, from October 2014 through June 2016, for two field services. Before that, the ship served in Pointe Noire, Republic of Congo from August 2013 till May 2014. Before The Republic of Congo the vessel was docked in Conakry, Guinea, and Lomé, Togo. The Africa Mercy docked in Freetown, Sierra Leone, for her 2011 field service, which lasted for ten months. At the conclusion of each field service, the Africa Mercy goes into dry dock, where it is resupplied and receives any needed repairs or upgrades before heading to her next port of call.

In 2019, the Africa Mercy docked in Dakar, Senegal, for a six-month field service. On February 1, 2022, the Africa Mercy returned to Dakar, Senegal with the goal to provide surgery to approximately 950 patients whose surgeries were delayed due to the COVID-19 pandemic. 

The new ship, the MV Global Mercy, in partnership with Stena RoRo, finished construction and joined the fleet in June 2021. The Global Mercy is the organization's first purpose-built hospital ship and is the largest civilian hospital ship in the world. In February 2023, the Global Mercy arrived in the Port of Dakar, Senegal, to begin her first surgical field service, where she is anticipated to provide more than 800 surgeries in the next five months.

Mission
Mercy Ships is a predominantly Christian interdenominational missionary organization, describing their mission as "bringing hope and healing to the forgotten poor, following the 2,000-year-old model of Jesus". The organization treats all patients free of charge, and without regard to their religion, race, or gender.

Mercy Ships vessels have visited 601 ports in 55 developing nations. Its volunteers have provided services and materials valued at over $1.77 billion. Mercy Ships has delivered services to more than 2.8 million direct beneficiaries and Mercy Ships volunteers have performed more than 108,000 free surgical procedures, such as cleft lip and palate, cataract removal, burn contracture release, and orthopedic and facial reconstruction. They have:
 Performed 521,000 dental procedures for over 197,000 dental patients.
 Trained more than 6,680 local professionals (including surgeons), who have in turn trained many others.
 Trained over 50,300 local professionals in their area of expertise (anesthesiology, nursing, sterilization, biomedical engineering, surgery, trauma, leadership).
 Taught over 268,000 local people in basic healthcare.
 Completed over 1,115 infrastructure development and agriculture projects.

Mercy Ships is a Better Business Bureau accredited charity. Mercy Ships has built a broad base of financial support, beginning with donations from the public and from crew members. Medical companies donate pharmaceuticals, equipment, and supplies to Mercy Ships. Corporations also make in-kind donations of materials such as fuel, food and building supplies. In addition, governments that work with Mercy Ships typically waive or cover port fees and associated costs for the ship to dock.

Togo

In 1991, the government of Togo became the first African nation to invite the Mercy Ship Anastasis to dock and provide free surgical care. The 2012 Field Service in Lomé, Togo, marked the fifth visit of Mercy Ships to the West African country. During the five-month stay in port, the ship's volunteer medical crew provided free surgeries, free dental procedures and trained local healthcare representatives. Mercy Ships also renovated portions of the Be-Kpota Anfamé Clinic in Lomé to serve as its 40-bed HOPE (Hospital Out-Patient Extension) Center for post-surgical recovery, which was returned to use as a Ministry of Health Clinic when the Africa Mercy departed.

Sierra Leone
Mercy Ships vessels have visited Sierra Leone five times, beginning in 1992. Mercy Ships has tailored its work in Sierra Leone to support the country's National Health Sector Strategic Plan, which aims to strengthen the national health system.

In December 2011, Mercy Ships signed on as a full partner to a Health Agreement with Sierra Leone, focusing on improving the country's principal hospitals. The agreement calls for Mercy Ships to focus on upgrading medical and surgical services, patient recordkeeping and the physical conditions of hospital buildings and infrastructure.

The organization's partner in Sierra Leone is the Aberdeen Women's Centre, formerly the Aberdeen West Africa Fistula Center. The Aberdeen Women's Centre is one of the few locations on the African continent offering obstetric fistula repair for women who have been injured during childbirth. Started by Mercy Ships with the Ministry of Health, Addax Foundation and other partners, the Fistula Centre is now operated by the Gloag Foundation (UK).

Republic of Congo

The Mercy Ships 2013 field service in Pointe Noire marked the first visit by a Mercy Ship to the Republic of Congo. Mercy Ships partnered with the country's Ministry of Health, and programs addressed requests by the authorities in Congo-Brazzaville to support continuing education opportunities for practicing professionals. Those included mentoring and training in nursing, anesthesiology, infection control, cataract removal surgery, basic surgical skills, trauma care, newborn resuscitation, palliative care, midwifery, and community health education. Mercy Ships partnered with local hospital infrastructures to help improve quality of care, teamwork and communication.

Madagascar

The 2015–2016 field service was the third Mercy Ships visit to Madagascar, located off the southeastern coast of Africa. Madagascar is the world's fourth-largest island nation. A political crisis in recent years has hampered the nation's ability to meet a number of millennium development goals and has taken a heavy toll on Madagascar's economy and people. According to the office of the President of Madagascar, there was a clear and important need for the expertise Mercy Ships brought to the nation, both in terms of specialized surgical and medical care as well as healthcare training and capacity building.

Benin

The 2016–2017 field service of the Africa Mercy took place in Cotonou, Benin, where the hospital ship docked from August 2016 through to June 2017. During the ship's 10-month stay in the port of Cotonou, Mercy Ships provided over 1,793 free surgeries for adult and child patients on board. The volunteer crew treated 6,942 people at a land-based dental clinic, mentored 88 Beninese healthcare professionals, and trained 1,874 participants in medical capacity building courses such as Essential Surgical Skills, Primary Trauma, Safe Anesthesia, and more.

Cameroon

The 2017–2018 field service of the Africa Mercy was completed in June 2018. During this port stay, Mercy Ships provided more than 2,508 surgeries for adult and child patients on board, treated more than 9,000 at a land-based dental clinic, and provided capacity building medical training courses to 1,475 Cameroonian healthcare professionals. These courses included SAFE Obstetric Anesthesia, SAFE Pediatric Anesthesia, Essential Surgical Skills, Primary Trauma Care and others. Additionally, 89 Cameroonian medical professionals were mentored including surgeons, nurses, anesthesia providers and healthcare workers.

Guinea

The Mercy Ships 2012 field service in Conakry marked the third visit by a Mercy Ship to Guinea, which was also visited by the earlier Mercy Ship Anastasis (now retired). Mercy Ships partnered with the country's Ministry of Health and Public Hygiene and other organizations to improve the country's health care delivery system. A special outreach was made to ensure that many patients from remote areas of the country were able to be screened for treatable conditions.

In August 2018 Mercy Ships arrived in Conakry for the fourth time and stayed there for a ten-month mission. During its stay in Guinea, Mercy Ships provided 2,230 patients with 2,442 specialized surgeries. The off-ship dental clinic treated 7,937 patients who received over 41,000 dental procedures. The medical capacity building program trained 1099 participants in courses including primary trauma care, essential surgical skills and more, while 155 anesthesia providers, nurses, surgeons, and other healthcare professionals participated in a mentoring program.

Senegal

From August 2019 to March 2020, the Africa Mercy was docked for its first field service in Dakar, Senegal. On February 1, 2022, the Africa Mercy returned to Dakar, Senegal, to resume operations for approximately 950 patients whose surgeries were delayed due to the COVID-19 pandemic. During the pandemic, Mercy Ships continued to collaborate closely with the government and Ministry of Health in Senegal, offering support in the form of PPE donations and ongoing medical training for local healthcare professionals.
In 2023, Mercy Ships began another field service in Senegal - this time with its newest, purpose-built vessel, the Global Mercy. The organization plans to provide 800-plus surgeries and train more than 600 local healthcare professionals between February and July 2023.

Capabilities

Medical capabilities

Medical personnel on the Africa Mercy provide surgeries and healthcare to treat a wide range of problems, including cleft lip and palate, cataract, bowed legs (genu varum), burns and burn scars, dental problems and obstetric fistula repair for injuries sustained during childbirth. Many of these ailments are extremely severe because patients have had little prior access to medical care. In addition, people with disfiguring medical conditions have often been shunned by their communities, so medical treatment from Mercy Ships can also help relieve the stigma and isolation that they have experienced.

The lower deck of the Africa Mercy is equipped with five operating theaters, 82-bed recovery wards, a CT scanner, an X-ray machine and a laboratory.

On the upper decks of the Africa Mercy, the ship has 126 cabins that provide accommodations for more than 400 crew, including families, couples, and individuals. The ship is equipped with a day care center, an accredited academy for all grades through senior year of high school, a library, a launderette, a shop for groceries and sundries, a restaurant, a gymnasium, and a donated Starbucks cafe. A fleet of 28 vehicles travels with the ship, for use in Mercy Ship's land-based operations.

Meanwhile,  the Global Mercy is 174 meters long, 28.6 meters wide and has space for 200 patients, six operating rooms, a laboratory, general outpatient clinics, dental, and eye clinics and training facilities.

The hospital decks cover a total area of 7,000 square meters and contain the latest training facilities. The ship can accommodate up to 950 people when docked, including crew members and volunteers from all over the world.

Expanding medical capacity

In addition to providing free surgical, medical, and dental care, Mercy Ships is committed to investing in local surgical infrastructure in ways that will continue to have a positive impact long after the ship leaves port. By developing medical facilities on land and training local personnel, Mercy Ships ensures that increased surgical care can be provided after the Global Mercy and Africa Mercy depart from their host countries.

The process of expanding surgical capacity includes renovating healthcare facilities in developing nations, as well as improving access to safe, affordable surgery. Development teams work with local leaders, governments, and the national ministries of health to assess surgical infrastructure needs and design projects that support the surgical ecosystem in a partner hospital. Throughout its decades of operation, Mercy Ships has supported various medical projects such as the construction or renovation of hospital surgical wards, clinic facilities and equipment for service, new maternity units, and operating theatres.

The renovation of healthcare facilities is paired with medical professional mentoring and training courses, both on ship and in-country, designed to improve the quality of services across an entire hospital setting.

Volunteer crew

Currently, Mercy Ships has more than 1,600 volunteers helping in locations around the world each year. During a typical year, this will include more than 1,550 volunteers from 60 nations serving on board the fleet. About 200 African nationals also serve as day crew on the ship in any given port. The addition of the Global Mercy is intended to double the organization's impact and will more than double its volunteer base. As the largest non-governmental hospital ship in the world, the Global Mercy has the capacity to accommodate 641 people on board, including crew and medical staff.

In addition to the medical volunteers on its ships, Mercy Ships is also known to send medical crews to aid at natural disaster sites such as the 2010 earthquake in Haiti.

Mercy Ships offers short-term (two weeks to two years) and long-term (minimum two years) volunteer opportunities. Mercy Ships needs volunteers for both medical and non-medical jobs. Due to the nature of the ship, positions for surgeons, dentists, and nurses are often readily available, but jobs such as deckhands, carpenters, seamen, teachers, cooks, engineers, machinists, welders, plumbers, videographers, photographers, writers, electricians and agriculturalists are also available. Volunteer crew often serve as blood donors, since there is a high demand for donated blood due to limited space to maintain a blood bank on board.

Volunteers with Mercy Ships are responsible for paying all costs associated with their service, including crew fees, travel expenses, passports, immunizations, insurance, and personal expenses. Because of this commitment, Mercy Ships is able to use direct contributions from its supporters to bring care to those who need it most.

References

International charities
Health charities in the United States
Evangelical Christian humanitarian organizations
Hospital ships
Christian organizations established in 1978
Medical and health organizations based in Texas